The Margaret Mahy Award, officially the Storylines Margaret Mahy Medal and Lecture Award, is a New Zealand literary prize presented to a person who has made a significant contribution to children's literature, publishing or literacy. Presented annually since 1991 by the Storylines Childrens Literature Charitable Trust of New Zealand, the award is named in honour of its first recipient, Margaret Mahy.

The Saturday closest to International Children's Book Day (unless this is during Easter) is called "Margaret Mahy Day" by the trust, during which they present the Margaret Mahy Award, as well as other awards. The recipient delivers a lecture during the ceremony, known as the "Margaret Mahy Lecture", which is subsequently published in the trust's yearbook, The Inside Story.

Recipients

References

External links

Margaret Mahy Medal Award at the Christchurch City Libraries website.
Storylines Childrens Literature Charitable Trust of New Zealand

New Zealand children's literary awards
Children's literary awards